Jarez (also spelled Jarz) is a Turkmen village in northern Syria, administratively part of the A'zaz District of Aleppo Governorate, located north of Aleppo. Nearby localities include A'zaz to the west, Kaljibrin to the southwest and Mare' to the southeast. According to the Syria Central Bureau of Statistics, Jarez had a population of 945 in the 2004 census. German traveler Martin Hartmann listed the village as Turkish village in late 19th century.

References

Populated places in Azaz District
Villages in Aleppo Governorate
Turkmen communities in Syria